Alejandro Silva (born July 28, 1958) is a retired male long-distance runner from Chile.



Career

He represented his native country at the 1984 Summer Olympics. He set his personal best in the men's marathon (2:18.10) in 1985.

Achievements

References
sports-reference

1958 births
Living people
Chilean male long-distance runners
Athletes (track and field) at the 1984 Summer Olympics
Olympic athletes of Chile
South American Games gold medalists for Chile
South American Games silver medalists for Chile
South American Games medalists in athletics
Competitors at the 1978 Southern Cross Games
Competitors at the 1982 Southern Cross Games